Artur Zahorulko (born 13 February 1993) is a Ukrainian footballer who plays as a midfielder and striker for FC Nyva Vinnytsia.

Career
Zahorulko is product of Youth Sportive School No.11 (FC Chornomorets Odesa) and of FC Shakhtar Donetsk youth systems. His first trainer was Serhiy Zaykov. From July 2015 he is playing on loan for FC Zorya.

He made his début in the Ukrainian Premier League, played for FC Zorya Luhansk in the game against FC Metalurh Zaporizhya in 17 July 2015.

References

External links

1993 births
Living people
Ukrainian footballers
Association football forwards
FC Shakhtar-3 Donetsk players
FC Zorya Luhansk players
Ukrainian Premier League players
Footballers from Odesa
FC Mariupol players
FC Vorskla Poltava players
FC Olimpik Donetsk players
FC Rukh Lviv players
FC Nyva Vinnytsia players
Ukrainian First League players
Ukrainian Second League players